HMS Beelzebub (or Belzebub) was a mortar vessel of the Royal Navy launched on 30 July 1813, and put into in ordinary. In 1816 she was put into service to participate in a naval campaign. On her return in 1817 she was again put into ordinary. The Navy had her broken up in 1820.

Career
In 1816 Beelzebub was taken out of ordinary, and Commander William Kempthorne was appointed on 2 July 1816 to command her. 

Beelzebub took part in Lord Exmouth's punitive expedition against the Dey of Algiers. She participated, on 27 August 1816, in the bombardment of Algiers (1816). During the bombardment Kempthorne commanded the division of bombs vessels. Beelzebubs large mortar fired once in every ten minutes. The mortar and rocket boats between them set all the vessels in the harbour on fire and the fire spread to the arsenal on the mole. Beelzebub had one man killed and two wounded in the bombardment.

His first lieutenant on Beelzebub was Lieutenant George Pierce. Kempthorne was promoted to post captain on 16 September 1816. He remained in command of Queen Charlotte until she was decommissioned.

Beelzebub was placed in ordinary at Plymouth in 1817. The Admiralty planned to have her repaired, but then she was broken up on 23 September 1820.

In 1847 the Admiralty authorised the award of the Naval General Service Medal with clasp "Algiers" to all surviving claimants from the battle.

Notes

Citations

References
 
 
 

1813 ships
Bomb vessels of the Royal Navy